The 2015–16 season was FC Porto's 106th competitive season and the 82nd consecutive season in the top flight of Portuguese football. It started on 15 August 2015 and concluded on 22 May 2016. For the second consecutive season, Porto failed to win any of the official competitions it was involved. The last time the team had two successive trophyless seasons was from 1979–80 to 1980–81.

As in the previous season, Porto did not begin their campaign by playing the Supertaça Cândido de Oliveira, as they failed to qualify for the 2015 edition by not winning the 2014–15 Primeira Liga title (retained by Benfica) or the 2014–15 Taça de Portugal (won by Sporting CP). Their 2015–16 Primeira Liga debut match was a 3–0 home win against Vitória de Guimarães, with Cameroon striker Vincent Aboubakar scoring the team's first official goal. Porto finished the league in third place with 73 points, 15 points behind three-time champions Benfica and 13 points behind runners-up Sporting CP, thus failing to win the title for the third successive season, which had not happened since the 2001–02 season.

Besides the league, Porto competed in other domestic competitions. In the 2015–16 Taça de Portugal, they reach the final, five years after their last appearance, but were defeated 5–4 on penalties by Braga, after a 2–2 draw at the end of extra time. The team also participated in the 2015–16 Taça da Liga, but were eliminated in the starting round after finishing last in their third-round group, with three defeats.

In UEFA competitions, Porto started the season in the 2015–16 UEFA Champions League, having qualified directly for the group stage for the 20th time, a competition record shared with Barcelona, Manchester United and Real Madrid. Having finished third in their group, Porto were demoted to the 2015–16 Europa League; they lost to Borussia Dortmund with a 3–0 aggregate score and were eliminated in the round of 32.

Players

Squad information

Transfers

In

Loan in

Loan return

Out

Loan out

End of loan

Pre-season and friendlies
The pre-season started on 6 July 2015 and included seven preparation matches, six of which played outside Portugal. From 10 to 18 July, the team was based at Horst, Netherlands, and played two matches against Dutch and German opposition. Season preparations continued at Marienfeld, Germany, from 23 to 31 July, where Porto staged two more matches against top-flight German teams before competing at the inaugural Colonia Cup tournament on 1–2 August. The pre-season ended on 8 August with a match against Napoli at the Estádio do Dragão, integrated in the team's presentation.

Competitions

Overall record

Primeira Liga

League table

Results by round

Matches

Taça de Portugal

Third round

Fourth round

Fifth round

Quarter-finals

Semi-finals

Final

Taça da Liga

Third round

UEFA Champions League

Group stage

UEFA Europa League

Round of 32

Statistics

Appearances and discipline

Goalscorers

References

FC Porto seasons
Porto
Porto